The 2013 IFAF Women's World Championship was the second IFAF Women's World Championship, an American football competition for women. It took place between 30 June and 6 July 2013. The tournament was hosted at the ISS Stadion in Vantaa, Finland. The defending champion, the United States, won its second title after defeating Canada 64–0 in the final. Host team Finland won the bronze medal.

Participating teams

Group stage

Group A

Group B

Placement games

See also
 American Football Association of Finland
 American football

References

External links
 Official website

IFAF Women's World Championship
Sport in Vantaa
American football in Finland
World Championship
American football
June 2013 sports events in Europe
July 2013 sports events in Europe